Pison peletieri is a wasp of the family Crabronidae. It is endemic to Australia, and was introduced to New Zealand in 2001.

Description

The species has a black head and mesosoma, while the metasoma, tibiae and leg tarsi are a red-brown colour. 

Pison peletieri creates nests of cells formed from mud.

Distribution

The species is found in all states of Australia except for Tasmania. Pison peletieri was first detected in Auckland, New Zealand in March 2001. As of 2022, the species has spread to Northland and the Waikato.

References

See also

Crabronidae
Hymenoptera of Australia
Hymenoptera of New Zealand
Insects described in 1841
Endemic fauna of Australia